This is a list of steamboats and related vessels which operated on Puget Sound and in western Washington state.  This should not be considered a complete list.  Information for some vessels may be lacking, or sources may be in conflict.

Table codes key
Vessel type codes are: Prop = propeller-driven; stern = sternwheel-driven; side = side-wheel driven; pddl or paddle = paddle-driven, sternwheel or sidewheel.
Disposition codes used in this list are:
 A = Abandoned.
 B = Burned
 C = Converted;  C-B = Converted to barge; C-D = converted to diesel engine; C-F = Converted to ferry; C-G = Converted to gasoline engine; C-H = Converted to house; C-S = converted to sailing vessel.
 F = Foundered at sea;
 G = Grounded (total loss).
  L = Laid up.
 M = Museum as of 2011.
 N = Name change
 O = Operational as of date given.
 R = renamed..
 S = sank.
 T = Transferred; T-AK = Transferred to Alaska; T-BC = Transferred to British Columbia; T-CA = Transferred to California; T-OR = Transferred to Oregon or to Columbia River; T-CB = Transferred to Coos Bay; T-GH = Transferred to Grays Harbor
 W = Wrecked by collision or striking ground;
 X = Explosion of boiler.
  Gr = gross tons; Reg = registered tons.

Vessels should not be assumed to have served continuously on Puget Sound during the periods shown on this chart; transfer between service areas was common.

Mosquito fleet list

Ships built for service elsewhere

Gasoline and naphtha launches

Ocean-going steam tugs

Name changes

Source conflicts

Notes

References 

 Affleck, Edwin L, ed. A Century of Paddlewheelers in the Pacific Northwest, the Yukon, and Alaska, Alexander Nicholls Press, Vancouver, BC (2000) 
 Carey, Roland, The Steamboat Landing on Elliott Bay, Alderbrook Publishing, Seattle, WA 1962
 Carey, Roland, The Sound of Steamers, Alderbrook Publishing, Seattle, WA 1965
 Downs, Art, Paddlewheels on the Frontier: The Story of British Columbia and Yukon Sternwheel Steamers, Superior Publishing, Seattle, WA (1972) 
 Faber, Jim, Steamer's Wake, Enetai Press, Seattle, WA 1985 
 Feagans, Raymond J., The Railroad that Ran by the Tide -- Ilwaco Railroad & Navigation Company of the State of Washington, Howell-North, Berkeley, CA 1972 
 Findlay, Jean Cammon and Paterson, Robin, Mosquito Fleet of Southern Puget Sound, (2008) Arcadia Publishing 
 Goodwin, Helen Durrie, "Shipbuilding in the Northwest", The Washington Historical Quarterly, Vol. 11, No. 3 (Jul. 1920), pages 183–201 .
 Harlan, George H., San Francisco Bay Ferryboats, Howell-North Books, Berkeley, CA ; LoC Card # 67-20998
 Kline, M.S., and Bayless, G.A., Ferryboats -- A legend on Puget Sound, Bayless Books, Seattle, WA 1983 
 Newell, Gordon, Ships of the Inland Sea, Binford and Mort, Portland, OR (2nd Ed. 1960)
 Newell, Gordon, and Williamson, Joe, Pacific Steamboats, Bonanza Books, New York, NY (1963)
 Newell, Gordon R., Pacific Tugboats, Superior Publishing, Seattle, WA (1957)
 Newell, Gordon R., ed., H.W. McCurdy Maritime History of the Pacific Northwest, Superior Publishing, Seattle, WA 1966
 Turner, Robert D., Pacific Princesses – An Illustrated History of Canadian Pacific Railway's Princess Fleet on the Pacific Northwest Coast, Sono Nis Press, Victoria, B.C., 1977

Government documents
 1868: U.S. Dept. of the Treasury, Bureau of Statistics, Annual List of Merchant Vessels of the United States (for year ending June 30, 1868)
 1879: U.S. Dept. of the Treasury, Bureau of Statistics, Annual List of Merchant Vessels of the United States (for year ending June 30, 1879)
1884:  U.S. Dept. of the Treasury, Bureau of Statistics, Annual List of Merchant Vessels of the United States (for year ending June 30, 1884)
 1894: U.S. Dept. of the Treasury, Bureau of Statistics, Annual List of Merchant Vessels of the United States (for year ending June 30, 1894)
 1901: U.S. Dept. of the Treasury, Bureau of Statistics, Annual List of Merchant Vessels of the United States (for year ending June 30, 1901)
 1909: U.S. Dept. of the Treasury, Bureau of Statistics, Annual List of Merchant Vessels of the United States (for year ending June 30, 1909)
 1918:  Department of Commerce, Bureau of Navigation, Seagoing Vessels of the United States (1918).
 1922: U.S. Dept. of Commerce, Bureau of Navigation, Annual List of Merchant Vessels of the United States (1922)

 
 
Puget Sound steamboats